Terrazoanthus sinnigeri is a species of uncertain validity (taxon inquirendum) of macrocnemic zoanthid first found in the Galapagos. It is potentially a junior synonym of Terrazoanthus patagonichus. It can be distinguished by commonly occurring on rubble and rocks on sandy bottoms, having about 30–36 tentacles, and numerous nematocysts in its pharynx.

References

Further reading
Swain, Timothy D., and Laura M. Swain. "Molecular parataxonomy as taxon description: examples from recently named Zoanthidea (Cnidaria: Anthozoa) with revision based on serial histology of microanatomy." Zootaxa 3796.1 (2014): 81-107.
Fujii, Takuma, and James Davis Reimer. "A new family of diminutive zooxanthellate zoanthids (Hexacorallia: Zoantharia)." Zoological Journal of the Linnean Society 169.3 (2013): 509-522.

Animals described in 2010
Hydrozoanthidae